Mohamad Al-Fateh bin Mohd Afandi is a Malaysian footballer who plays as a midfielder for Manjung City in the Malaysia M3 League.

References

External links
 

Living people
Malaysian footballers
Malaysia Super League players
PKNP FC players
Association football midfielders
1997 births